Tintomara is a 1970 Swedish-Danish drama film directed by Hans Abramson and starring Pia Grønning, Britt Ekland and Eva Dahlbeck. It is based on the novel Drottningens juvelsmycke by Jonas Love Almqvist. It features one of Swedish literature's most enduringly popular characters, the intersex Tintomara.

Cast
 Eva Dahlbeck as Baroness
 Britt Ekland as Adolfine
 Monica Ekman as Amanda
 Pia Grønning as Tintomara
 Torben Hundal as Ankarström
 Jørgen Kiil as Uncle
 Bill Öhrström as Clas Henrik
 Hardy Rafn as Priest
 Bruno Wintzell as Ferdinand

References

External links

1970 films
1970 drama films
1970s Swedish-language films
Films about intersex
Swedish drama films
Danish drama films
1970s Swedish films